Joculator granatus is a species of minute sea snail, a marine gastropod mollusc in the family Cerithiopsidae. The species was described by Kay in 1979.

References

 Cecalupo A. & Robba E. (2010) The identity of Murex tubercularis Montagu, 1803 and description of one new genus and two new species of the Cerithiopsidae (Gastropoda: Triphoroidea). Bollettino Malacologico 46: 45-64

Gastropods described in 1979
granata